Baalbhaarti is 2022 Indian Marathi-language drama film written and directed by Nitin Nandan. Produced by A Sphereorigins Production.

Cast 

 Siddhartha Jadhav
 Nandita Patkar
 Abhijeet Khandkekar
 Aaryan Menghji
 Usha Naik
 Ravindra Mankani
 Sanjay Mone

Reception

Critical reception 
Jyoti Vyankatesh of Bolly.com rate 3 and states "It is funny how parents want their child to master English, although there is nothing wrong with that but at what cost, especially since today English seems to be the benchmark of intelligence. The film drives home the fact that there are many people who are very successful but are not fluent in the English language because language is linked to emotions and culture. Balbharti revealed many layers related to language."

Release and marketing 
Initially film was set to be released on 11 November 2022. Later it was released on 2 December 2022 in theaters.

Siddharth Jadhav showed the trailer of the movie to the Chief Minister of Maharashtra state Eknath Shinde and interacted with the trailer of the movie Baalbhaarti. Shinde gave a positive response to the film. While the shooting of the 2022 Hindi film Circus movie was going on, Jadhav promoted the movie through Instagram with some Bollywood actors like Ranveer Singh, Pooja Hegde, Varun Sharma, Jacqueline Fernandez.

Soundtrack

References

External links 
 

2022 films
2020s Marathi-language films
2022 drama films